The 2011 Arkansas State Red Wolves football team represented Arkansas State University in the 2011 NCAA Division I FBS football season. The Red Wolves were led by first-year head coach Hugh Freeze and played their home games at ASU Stadium. They are members of the Sun Belt Conference. They finished the season 10–3, 8–0 in Sun Belt play to become conference champions. They were invited to the Godaddy.com Bowl where they were defeated by Northern Illinois 20–38.

Freeze resigned at the end of the regular season to take the head coaching job at Ole Miss. David Gunn was the Red Wolves interim head coach for the GoDaddy.com Bowl.

Schedule

References

Arkansas State
Arkansas State Red Wolves football seasons
Sun Belt Conference football champion seasons
{Arkansas State Red Wolves football